Luan Guilherme de Jesus Vieira (born 27 March 1993) is a Brazilian professional footballer who plays as an attacking midfielder for Corinthians.

Club career

Early career
Luan was born in São José do Rio Preto, São Paulo. After starting it out at futsal and playing for amateur clubs in his native state, he joined Tanabi.

Luan scored two goals in nine appearances for Tanabi, being also a teammate of Túlio Maravilha. He subsequently represented his hometown club América-SP in 2013 Copa São Paulo de Futebol Júnior, while still owned by Tanabi.

On 8 February 2013, Luan joined Catanduvense until the end of the year, for a fee of R$120,000. He made his maiden appearance for the club eight days later, coming on as a second-half substitute in a 1–3 home loss against Santo André.

Grêmio

Shortly after making his debut for Catanduvense, Luan moved to Grêmio and returned to youth football; he later had 50% of his federative rights bought for just R$ 300,000. He was promoted to the first team in December 2013, mainly as a backup to Kléber and Hernán Barcos.

Luan made his first team debut for Tricolor on 19 January 2014, starting in a 0–1 Campeonato Gaúcho away loss against São José. His debut club goal was ten days later, netting the equalizer in a 1–1 draw at Brasil de Pelotas.

Luan finished the tournament with 14 appearances and three goals, as his side finished second. He made his Série A debut on 27 April 2014, starting in a 2–1 home win against Atlético Mineiro.

Luan scored his first goal in the Brazilian football top division on 17 August 2014, netting the first through a penalty in a 2–0 home success over Criciúma. He scored three more goals in the 2014 season, also appearing in the year's Copa Libertadores.

On 29 March 2015, Luan scored all goals in a 2–0 home win against São Paulo-RS. In the 2015 Campeonato Brasileiro, he scored ten goals to help his side finish third; highlights included braces against fierce rivals Internacional (5–0 home win) and Palmeiras (2–3 away loss).

On 30 November 2015, Luan was included in the year's Brasileirão Team of the Year, being the tournament's best forward alongside Santos' Ricardo Oliveira.

Luan is the top scorer at the Arena do Grêmio with 29 goals. In August 2017, it was reported that Liverpool had sent scouts to monitor his progress.

Luan scored of one of Grêmio's goals in the 2017 Copa Libertadores final against Lanús and Grêmio won the title. He was voted the best player of the 2017 Copa Libertadores with eight goals in twelve appearances and was again voted to the Campeonato Brasileiro Team of the Year in 2017.

In October 2018, Luan suffered a muscle tear in his foot and could not participate in Grêmio's 2018 Copa Libertadores semi-final against River Plate, in which Grêmio were eliminated. Luan finished the 2018 Campeonato Brasileiro with one goal.

Corinthians
On 14 December 2019, it was announced that Luan would be sold to Corinthians for around R$ 22 million. It was reported that he received a four-year contract. After scoring twice in two pre-season matches, he made his official debut for the club on 23 January 2020, starting and scoring his team's second through a penalty kick in a 4–1 Campeonato Paulista home routing of Botafogo-SP.

Despite being a regular starter in the 2020 Campeonato Paulista, Luan lost his starting spot after the departure of manager Tiago Nunes, and was constantly an unused substitute in the following years.

Loan to Santos
On 5 August 2022, Luan moved to Santos on loan until the end of the season, with an option for an additional year. On 22 November, after just eight appearances, Santos announced that his loan would not be renewed.

International career
Luan was named in Brazil's provisional squad for Copa América Centenario but was cut from the final squad. Later in the season, he was selected as a member of Brazil's squad for the 2016 Summer Olympics.

In Brazil's quarter final clash with Colombia, Luan scored the second goal of the match in an eventual 2–0 win, and finished the tournament as a starter. On 26 January 2017, he made his full international debut, replacing Diego Souza in a 1–0 friendly win against Colombia.

Career statistics

Club

International

Honours

Club
Grêmio
Copa do Brasil: 2016
Copa Libertadores: 2017
Recopa Sudamericana: 2018
Campeonato Gaúcho: 2018, 2019

International
Brazil U23
 Olympic Gold Medal: 2016

Brazil U20
 Toulon Tournament: 2014

Individual
 Campeonato Gaúcho XI: 2014
 Campeonato Gaúcho Best Newcomer: 2014
 Campeonato Brasileiro Série A Team of the Year: 2015, 2017
 Copa Libertadores Best Player: 2017
 South American Footballer of the Year: 2017

References

External links
Luan profile at Portal Oficial do Grêmio 

1993 births
Living people
People from São José do Rio Preto
Brazilian footballers
Association football forwards
Grêmio Foot-Ball Porto Alegrense players
Sport Club Corinthians Paulista players
Santos FC players
Campeonato Brasileiro Série A players
Brazil youth international footballers
Brazil under-20 international footballers
Brazil international footballers
Copa Libertadores-winning players
Olympic footballers of Brazil
Footballers at the 2016 Summer Olympics
Olympic gold medalists for Brazil
Olympic medalists in football
Medalists at the 2016 Summer Olympics
South American Footballer of the Year winners
Footballers from São Paulo (state)